The BAT F.K.28 Crow was a British single-seat ultralight aircraft produced by British Aerial Transport Company Limited of London. It was intended to be the "aerial equivalent of the motor cycle".

Design and development
The smallest of designs from Frederick Koolhoven when he worked for the British Aerial Transport Company was the F.K.28 Crow.  It was very small and light high-wing monoplane, with a conventional tractor configuration.  The monoplane's tail surfaces were carried by two slim booms.  An ABC Gnat 2-cylinder horizontally-opposed engine - together with fuel and oil tanks - was mounted on the wing centre section. The pilot's seat was set between the landing gear suspended below the wing. It was designed to be dismantled for road-transport with the removal of twelve bolts. It was displayed at the First Air Traffic Exhibition in Amsterdam, but it did not fly until some time later. It only flew once and proved to be underpowered.  It was scrapped in 1920.

Specifications (F.K.28 Crow)

References

Further reading

External links

Koolhoven aircraft

1920s British civil aircraft
Crow
Single-engined tractor aircraft
Twin-boom aircraft
Koolhoven aircraft
High-wing aircraft
Aircraft first flown in 1920